Nuruzzaman Biswas is a Bangladeshi politician and a Jatiya Sangsad member-elect of Pabna-4 constituency.

Career
In 2020, Nuruzzaman Biswas elected as a member of parliament by election in Pabna-4 constituency. He wins by 2,39,924 votes of this election.

The Jatiya Sangsad seat for Pabna-4 constituency fell vacant after former Awami League MP Shamsur Rahman Sherif died on 2 April 2020, so the by-election was held on 26 September. Biswas is also the current chairman of Ishwardi Upazila and vice-president of the Pabna zila Awami League.

References

Living people
Awami League politicians
11th Jatiya Sangsad members
Place of birth missing (living people)
Date of birth missing (living people)
Year of birth missing (living people)